Stefano Vecchi (born 20 July 1971) is an Italian retired professional footballer turned coach, who is currently in charge of Feralpisalò.

Playing career
An Inter youth product, Vecchi had an unremarkable career as a central midfielder in the lower leagues of Italian football, not going any further than Serie C1 and narrowly missing an historical promotion to Serie B during his stint at Fiorenzuola. He retired in 2005.

Coaching career
After his retirement, Vecchi took a coaching career starting from the amateur leagues of Lombardy. He had a breakthrough during his two-year period at Tritium, leading the small club from Trezzo sull'Adda to two consecutive promotions from Serie D to Lega Pro Prima Divisione (ex-Serie C1) before accepting an offer from fallen giants SPAL, a former team of his as a player; however, this season, characterized by financial and off-field issues, ended with relegation to Lega Pro Seconda Divisione.

He successively took another coaching role at Südtirol, reaching the promotion playoffs in his only season. The team lost to Carpi, Vecchi's future employer. The Serie B newcomers offered him their managerial spot despite his lack of valid coaching license to serve as head coach in the second tier of Italy. His stint at Carpi was however cut short in March 2014, when he was removed from managerial duties due to disappointing results.

In mid-2014, he joined former club Inter's non-playing staff as coach of the Primavera under-19 team , which he led to victory at the 2015 Torneo di Viareggio and the 2016 Coppa Italia Primavera.

In November 2016, he also served as caretaker manager for the first team, filling in after Frank de Boer's dismissal for the 2016–17 UEFA Europa League game against Southampton (a 1–2 loss) and a Serie A league game against Crotone (ended in a 3–0 win). He was then once again appointed as caretaker on 9 May 2017, for the final three games of the season, in place of Stefano Pioli. Vecchi also led the Primavera team to win the Campionato Nazionale Primavera on 11 June 2017, after his caretaker spell with the first team had ended.

Vecchi left Inter in July 2018 to accept an offer as head coach of Venezia in the Serie B league; his experience was however short-lived, as he was dismissed on 11 October 2018 due to poor results.

In 2019 he took over at Serie C club Südtirol, which he guided for two full seasons in the Italian third division with positive results. He left the club in June 2021.

Managerial statistics

References

1971 births
Living people
Italian footballers
Association football midfielders
Serie C players
Serie D players
Spezia Calcio players
S.S. Arezzo players
U.S. Fiorenzuola 1922 S.S. players
S.P.A.L. players
F.C. Pavia players
Italian football managers
Inter Milan non-playing staff
Inter Milan managers
F.C. Südtirol managers
Serie A managers
Serie B managers
Serie C managers